Macroglossum wolframmeyi is a moth of the family Sphingidae first described by Ulf Eitschberger and Colin G. Treadaway in 2004. It is known from the Cuyo Archipelago in the Philippines.

References

Macroglossum
Moths described in 2004